Hamilton Academical Football Club is a professional football club from Hamilton, South Lanarkshire. They were established in 1874 and entered the Scottish Cup for the first time in 1876.

In November 1897 they were admitted to the Scottish Football League for the 1897–98 season, following the dismissal of Renton, with the club taking over their previous four results and remaining fixtures for the season.

The club advertised for a Secretary/Manager, a new post, in March 1914. There were nearly 100 applicants. A short list of 15 was drawn up and from them 3 people were to be interviewed, James Collins, who was Secretary of the Glasgow Junior League, Peter Hodge the former Secretary/Manager of Raith Rovers and Alex Raisbeck an ex-Scotland player and then playing for Partick Thistle.

Raisbeck was chosen and would take up his duties in May 1914 when the season officially closed.

The club's longest serving manager was Willie McAndrew who became manager in 1925 and stayed until 1946. McAndrew managed arguably the greatest Hamilton team when they finished 4th in the 1934–35 season, their highest ever placing, and were Scottish Cup finalists.

John Lambie has the best record in terms of league trophies; having won the Scottish First Division twice.

Managerial Performance - League
The Scottish Football league began with one division of teams in 1890–91. Since then it has expanded and contracted between one and four divisions.

To gauge a manager's performance the list below is broken down into the level of league they were in at the time they were league winners or runners-up. Currently the Scottish Premier League would be classed as the 1st tier of Scottish football league system while the Scottish Third Division would be classed as the 4th.

Second tier

Third tier

Fourth tier

Managerial Performance - Cups
The premier cup competition in Scotland is the Scottish Cup. The club have also gained success in the Scottish Challenge Cup.

Scottish Cup

Scottish Challenge Cup

Managerial statistics - League
Below is the full Scottish League record of every Hamilton manager (excluding manager's who were in control for less than 20 games).

As of 1 May 2007.

References

Managers
 
Hamilton
Managers